The Danish Church Abroad / Danish Seamen's Church (Danish: Danske Sømands- og Udlandskirker, literally: "Danish Seamen's and Abroad Churches") is a Protestant church. It was founded 1 January 2004 as the result of a fusion between the Danish Church Abroad and the Danish Seamen's Church in foreign ports. It was established to help Danes travelling abroad, particularly seafarers and migrant workers.

There are 53 Danish seamen's and overseas churches around the world. Several operate on a Scandinavian basis with Swedish and Norwegian churches. The Danish Church in Southern Schleswig belongs to the church.

The Danish Church Abroad / Danish Seamen's Church is working on an Evangelical-Lutheran foundation and in affiliation with the Evangelical-Lutheran Church in Denmark in Denmark.

Danish churches abroad

Asia

Hong Kong, China
Pelepas, Malaysia
Singapore

Europe
Algeciras, Spain
Berlin, Germany
Brussels, Belgium
Fuengirola, Spain 
Geneva, Switzerland
Göteborg, Sweden
Hamburg, Germany
Hull, UK
Jerusalem, Israel
London, UK
Luxembourg, Luxembourg
Paris, France
Rotterdam, Netherlands
Costa del Sol, Spain

North America
Calgary, Alberta, Canada
Edmonton, Alberta, Canada
Grimsby, Ontario, Canada
New York City, United States
Surrey, British Columbia, Canada
Toronto, Ontario, Canada
Vancouver, British Columbia, Canada

Oceania
Dunedin, New Zealand
Sydney, Australia

South America 
Buenos Aires, Argentina
Necochea, Argentina
Tandil, Argentina
Tres Arroyos, Argentina

Former locations
China 1910s–1950s: Lüshun Lutheran Church, Dalian Lutheran Church, and others

See also
Church of Sweden Abroad (Svenska kyrkan i utlandet)
Finnish Seamen's Mission (Finlands Sjömanskyrka)
Scandinavian churches in London
Norwegian Seamen’s Churches (Norske Sjømannskirken)

References

External links

The church's home page

Church of Denmark
Christian missions to seafarers